Gilles Augustin Binya (born 29 August 1984) is a Cameroonian retired footballer who played as a defensive midfielder.

He spent most of his career in Turkey, representing Gaziantepspor and Elazığspor and appearing in 87 Süper Lig matches for the former club. He also competed professionally, other than in his own country, in Algeria, Portugal and Switzerland.

Binya won 17 caps for Cameroon, representing the country in two Africa Cup of Nations.

Club career
Born in Yaoundé, Binya signed with S.L. Benfica for 2007–08 after spending three years at Algerian club MC Oran. At the beginning of the season the Portuguese planned to loan him to fellow Primeira Liga side C.F. Estrela da Amadora for a year, but with the substitution of manager Fernando Santos for José Antonio Camacho the deal was cancelled, and the player remained with Benfica.

While playing for the latter team in the UEFA Champions League in November 2007, Binya was shown a straight red card by referee Martin Hansson following a dangerous challenge on Celtic's Scott Brown. On 16 November 2007 UEFA gave him a six-match ban, meaning that he would play no further part in the remaining two Champions League group fixtures against A.C. Milan and FC Shakhtar Donetsk as well as the four following European matches.

Domestically, Binya finished the campaign with 16 league appearances, profiting from forced absences to first-choice holding midfielder, Portuguese international Petit. In 2008–09 he was used rarely, but still collected four yellow cards in only seven games (including two in a 0–2 loss at C.D. Trofense); at the season's closure he was deemed surplus to requirements, going on to serve a loan at Switzerland's Neuchâtel Xamax.

On 16 June 2010, Binya was signed by Neuchâtel on a three-year contract. In August of the following year, he was loaned to Gaziantepspor in the Süper Lig, with the move being made permanent subsequently.

International career
Binya was first called up to the Cameroon national team in October 2007, by national manager Otto Pfister. Subsequently, he went on to represent his country at the 2008 Africa Cup of Nations, where Cameroon finished second to Egypt – Pfister was also the team's coach.

References

External links
 
 
 
 

1984 births
Living people
Footballers from Yaoundé
Cameroonian footballers
Association football midfielders
Tonnerre Yaoundé players
Algerian Ligue Professionnelle 1 players
MC Oran players
Primeira Liga players
S.L. Benfica footballers
Swiss Super League players
Neuchâtel Xamax FCS players
Süper Lig players
TFF First League players
Gaziantepspor footballers
Elazığspor footballers
Cameroon international footballers
2008 Africa Cup of Nations players
2010 Africa Cup of Nations players
Cameroonian expatriate footballers
Expatriate footballers in Algeria
Expatriate footballers in Portugal
Expatriate footballers in Switzerland
Expatriate footballers in Turkey
Cameroonian expatriate sportspeople in Algeria
Cameroonian expatriate sportspeople in Portugal
Cameroonian expatriate sportspeople in Switzerland
Cameroonian expatriate sportspeople in Turkey